The South Wales Miners' Federation (SWMF), nicknamed "The Fed", was a trade union for coal miners in South Wales.  It survives as the South Wales Area of the National Union of Mineworkers.

Forerunners
The Amalgamated Association of Miners (AAM) was influential in South Wales during the early 1870s, but it collapsed in 1875.  Of the AAM's various districts, only the Cambrian Miners' Association survived the collapse, but it steadily grew in membership, and other local unions were founded.  The local unions disagreed over whether to negotiate wages as part of a "sliding scale", where pay rose and fell in line with coal export prices.  This began to change in 1892, when the unions formed a joint committee.  Its initial members were William Abraham, David Beynon, Thomas Davies, Daronwy Isaac, J. Jones, David Morgan, Alfred Onions and Morgan Weeks from the sliding scale districts, and David Ajax, John Davies, J. Edwards, Joseph Phillips and M. Williams from the non-sliding scale districts.  Thomas Richards was elected as secretary, and the following year, Abraham was elected as president, Morgan as vice-president, and Josiah Edwards as the treasurer.  The committee achieved little, but formed a basis for the formation of the SWMF.

Foundation
The union was founded on 24 October 1898, following the defeat of the South Wales miners' strike of 1898.  Numerous local coal miners' unions found their funds depleted and decided to merge.  They include:

Prior to the formation of the Federation, these local unions had relatively little success in securing widespread trade union membership. Chris Williams estimates that, while reliable figures are unavailable, it appears that no more than 18% of the workforce in the South Wales Coalfield were union members between 1892 and 1897. This was well below the British average of 39% and significantly lower than Scotland (25%), Yorkshire (58%) and the north-east of England (59%).

Despite its name, the new union was not a federation; the former unions were dissolved and became the basis of twenty districts, each with one or more full-time agents. It had an immediate impact. By the end of 1898, the union had 60,000 members, or 47% of the coalfield workforce, and by 1900 this had risen to 127,894 or 87% of the workforce.

Early years
By 1914, four districts had more than 10,000 members: Anthracite, Monmouthshire & Western Valleys, Rhondda No.1, and Tredegar Valley.

History
The new union affiliated to the Miners' Federation of Great Britain (MFGB) in 1899.

In the early twentieth century, its leadership were aligned with the Liberal Party; MPs Thomas Richards, William Abraham, John Williams and William Brace all took the Liberal Party whip in parliament.  However, when the MFGB held a ballot on affiliation to the Labour Party in 1906, a majority of SWMF members voted in favour.  As the national federation narrowly voted against, another vote was held in 1908, by which time SWMF members voted 74,675 to 44,616 in favour.  Some in the union were radicalised by such events as the Cambrian Combine Dispute and the Tonypandy Riot of 1910.

The union was divided into districts, and in the early years, these were powerful bodies.  They varied greatly in size, and those with more than 3,000 members were entitled to an automatic place on the union's executive, plus an extra place for each additional 6,000 members.  Each district held a monthly meeting, comprising one delegate from each lodge, and was led by a district executive.  Each district elected at least one agent, who then served until they chose to retire, thus making the role hugely important.

The number of districts gradually increased, to a peak of twenty, then with the abolition to the tiny Saundersfoot district, continued at nineteen until 1934.  By this point, most districts were struggling financially, and so a complete restructure took place.  The districts were replaced by eight areas, employing one or more agents, but otherwise much less important, governance moving to the level of the combine or lodge.

These were gradually reduced, and by 1979 only five districts existed:

 Aberdare, Rhondda and Merthyr
 Maesteg
 Monmouthshire
 Rhymney
 Swansea

Over the years, there were a few splits from the union. The Monmouthshire and South Wales Colliery Enginemen, Stokers and Surface Craftsmen's General Association left in 1903. The South Wales Miners' Industrial Union, a moderate breakaway union was set up in 1926 in opposition to the General Strike but was disbanded in 1938.  In 1940, the SWMF also started representing miners in the Forest of Dean.

In 1945, the MFGB became the National Union of Mineworkers (NUM), and the Fed became the NUM (South Wales Area), with less autonomy than before.

In 1960, the South Wales Area was expanded to include the Somerset coalfield.

Leadership

Presidents

Secretaries

Vice presidents

References

Coalfield Web Materials: South Wales Miners' Federation
GENUKI: The Fed

Sources
Edwards, Ness History of the South Wales Miners' Federation; vol. 1. Lawrence & Wishart, 1938

Defunct trade unions of the United Kingdom
Mining trade unions
National Union of Mineworkers (Great Britain)
Mining in Wales
1898 establishments in Wales
Coal mining in Wales
Trade unions established in 1898
Trade unions in Wales